Matando Güeros (Killing Güeros) is the debut album by the band Brujeria. "Güero" is a Mexican-Spanish slang term for a blonde or light skinned/haired person. The album talks mostly about controversial topics in Mexico like drug trafficking, satanic rituals, sexuality, migration,  illegal border crossing, and Anti-Americanism (like the title song, that talks about a revenge killing-spree against the White Americans that mistreated the indigenous Mexican narrator).

Album information
The front cover depicts a person out of shot holding up a severed head, which was taken from Mexican Shocking and Sensationalistic/Yellow journalistic newspaper ¡Alarma! The album was banned in many places due to its cover and content. This head, nicknamed "Coco Loco", has been taken by the band as a mascot and logo. Track 16 to 19 are taken from the Machetazos single; "Matando Güeros" was on the Gummo soundtrack.

Critical reception
Heavy Metal: The Music And Its Culture placed the album on its "100 Definitive Metal Albums" list.

Track listing
All songs written and arranged by Brujeria. (1993 Roadblock Music ASCAP/Machetazos Music ASCAP)
 "Pura de Venta" – 0:42 ("Pure for Sale")
 "Leyes Narcos" – 1:10 ("Narco Laws")
 "Sacrificio" – 1:16 ("Sacrifice")
 "Santa Lucía" – 0:43 ("Saint Lucia")
 "Matando Güeros" – 2:25 ("Killing Whites")
 "Seis Seis Seis" – 1:19 ("Six Six Six")
 "Cruza la Frontera" – 1:44 ("Cross the Border")
 "Greñudos Locos" – 1:28 ("Long-Haired Maniacs")
 "Chingo de Mecos" – 1:16 ("Fuckload of Cum")
 "Narcos Satánicos" – 1:50 ("Satanic Narcos")
 "Desperado" – 2:42 ("Desperado")
 "Culeros" – 0:52 ("Assholes")
 "Misas Negras (Sacrificio III)" – 1:21 ("Black Masses [Sacrifice III]")
 "Chinga Tu Madre" – 3:11  ("Go Fuck Yourself")
 "Verga del Brujo / Están Chingados" – 3:43 ("Warlock's Cock / You Are Fucked")
 "Molestando Niños Muertos" – 2:57 ("Molesting Dead Children")
 "Machetazos (Sacrificio II)" – 1:27 ("Machete Attack [Sacrifice II]")
 "Castigo del Brujo" – 1:44 ("Punishment of the Warlock")
 "Cristo de la Roca" – 1:13 ("Christ of the Stone")

Personnel

Brujeria
 Juan Brujo - vocals
 Asesino - guitars
 Hongo - guitars, additional bass
 Güero Sin Fe - bass, additional guitars
 Fantasma - additional bass, backing vocals
 Pinche Peach - samples, backing vocals 
 Greñudo - drums

Additional personnel
 Hozicon Jr. - direction

References

Brujeria (band) albums
1993 debut albums
Roadrunner Records albums
Obscenity controversies in music